Judy Garland has been the subject of many biographies. Since her death in 1969, she has been the subject of over two dozen books. The first of these was The films and Career of Judy Garland by Morella and Epstein, published by Citadel Press. It was the only book published before her death. The second was Brad Steiger's Judy Garland, published shortly after her death, which includes information on Garland's astrological chart, analysis of her handwriting, numerology and biorhythms. Most of the books are entirely about Garland, but some, including Patricia Fox-Sheinwold's Too Young to Die, Some Are Born Great by Adela Rogers St. Johns and Jane Ellen Wayne's The Golden Girls of MGM, merely feature a chapter about her. Two volumes, Rainbow's End: The Judy Garland Show by Coyne Steven Sanders and Mel Tormé's The Other Side of the Rainbow: On the Dawn Patrol With Judy Garland, focus on Garland's television series, The Judy Garland Show. Garland's last husband, Mickey Deans, co-authored an early biography in 1972 and Garland's daughter Lorna Luft wrote a family memoir in 1988.

Garland has been profiled on-screen several times. The earliest known film biography was a 1961 installment of the syndicated television series Hollywood Hist-o-rama, which covered her career through the filming of A Star is Born. Garland was the subject of episodes of the British series Omnibus, 60 Minutes, Biography and the E! True Hollywood Story. Her life story was fictionalized in Rainbow in 1978 and in 2001 in Life with Judy Garland: Me and My Shadows, based on daughter Luft's memoir. On stage, Garland is a character in The Boy from Oz, a 1998 musical based on the life of former son-in-law Peter Allen, and the 2006 play The Property Known as Garland, based on tape recordings made prior to her last concert appearance.

Print

Film and video

Stage

See also
 List of Judy Garland awards and honors
 List of Judy Garland performances
 Judy Garland discography

References

External links
 Judy Garland on Hollywood Hist-o-rama

Biography
Garland
Garland